Ernest George Perry (25 April 1910 – 28 December 1998) was a British Labour Party politician.

Biography

Early career
Perry was an insurance contractor and served as a councillor (Alderman) on Battersea Borough Council 1934–65 and was Mayor 1955–56, during which time he served as a Justice of the Peace (J.P.), becoming a councillor on the successor London Borough of Wandsworth from 1964. He was President of Battersea Labour Party and Trades Council, and of the Federation of British Cremation Authorities.

Time as an MP
At the 1964 general election, Perry was elected Member of Parliament for Battersea South.  He was a government whip from 1968 to 1970 and again in 1974.  He retired as an MP at the 1979 general election, and was succeeded by Alf Dubs.

References
Times Guide to the House of Commons October 1974

External links 

1910 births
1998 deaths
Councillors in the London Borough of Wandsworth
GMB (trade union)-sponsored MPs
Labour Party (UK) MPs for English constituencies
Members of Battersea Metropolitan Borough Council
Ministers in the Wilson governments, 1964–1970
UK MPs 1964–1966
UK MPs 1966–1970
UK MPs 1970–1974
UK MPs 1974
UK MPs 1974–1979